Taqi Kandi (also Romanized as Taqī Kandī) is a village in Chaldoran-e Jonubi Rural District, in the Central District of Chaldoran County, West Azerbaijan Province, Iran. At the 2006 census, its population was 172, in 28 families.

References 

Populated places in Chaldoran County